The Summer Symphony Tour is the second symphonic tour (and sixth overall concert tour) by American recording artist, Josh Groban. The tour supports Groban's sixth studio album, All That Echoes (2013). The tour primarily visited the United States with nine shows along the East Coast.

Orchestras
Cary: North Carolina Symphony
Vienna: National Symphony Orchestra
Hopewell: CMAC Symphony Orhcestra
Bethel: Syracuse Symphony Orchestra
Scranton: Northeastern Pennsylvania Philharmonic
Philadelphia: Chamber Orchestra of Philadelphia
Uncasville: Donn Trenner Orchestra
Lenox: Boston Pops Orchestra

Setlist
The following setlist was obtained from the August 29, 2014 concert; held at the Mohegan Sun Arena in Uncasville, Connecticut. It does not represent all shows for the duration of the tour. 
"Changing Colours"
"February Song"
"Alejate"
"Vincent"
"Alla Luce del Sole"
"Falling Slowly"
"Play Me" 
"Caruso" 
"Instrumental Sequence" 
"Você Existe Em Mim"
"Happy in My Heartache"
"Per Te"
"Children Will Listen" / "Not While I'm Around"
"To Where You Are" 
"I Believe (When I Fall in Love It Will Be Forever)"
"You Raise Me Up"
Encore 
"Smile"

Tour dates

Box office score data

External links
Groban's Official Website
Groban's Official Facebook Page
Groban's Official YouTube Page
Groban's Official Myspace Page

References

2014 concert tours
Josh Groban concert tours